Benjamin Joseph Blencowe  is a British and Canadian molecular biologist, currently appointed as Professor and Banbury Chair in Medical Research at the University of Toronto. He also serves as Director of the University of Toronto’s Donnelly Sequencing Centre.

Education 
Blencowe studied microbiology and molecular biology at Imperial College London, where he received an BSc (with first class honours) in 1988. He undertook graduate research at the European Molecular Biology Laboratory, as an external student of the University of London, earning his PhD in 1991.

Career and research
After receiving his PhD, Blencowe joined the Center of Cancer Research (renamed Koch Institute for Integrative Cancer Research) at the Massachusetts Institute of Technology as a Human Frontier Science Program Long Term Fellow in 1992. He was appointed Assistant Professor at University of Toronto in 1998 and promoted to full Professor in 2006.

Blencowe’s research focuses on fundamental questions relating to RNA biology. His research group has made pioneering contributions to the development and application of high-throughput methods for studying RNA processing and RNA-RNA interactions. This research has contributed global-scale insights into the complexity, evolution, regulation and function of alternative splicing, including the discovery of splicing networks that control stem cell pluripotency and neurogenesis. His most recent research led to the discovery of a program of alternative splicing that is commonly disrupted in neurological disorders, work that has opened the door to a new therapeutic strategy for autism.

Selected publications

Honors and awards 
Blencowe received the Premier of Ontario Research Excellence Award in 1999 and the Canadian Society of Molecular Biosciences Senior Investigator Award in 2011. He was a recipient of the Natural Sciences and Engineering Research Council of Canada John C. Polanyi Award in 2011 for his contributions to the understanding of the RNA splicing code. Blencowe was elected Fellow of the Royal Society of Canada (FRSC) in 2017, and Fellow of the Royal Society (FRS) in 2019.

References 

Living people
Canadian biologists
Fellows of the Royal Society
Academic staff of the University of Toronto
Year of birth missing (living people)
Canadian Fellows of the Royal Society